Lancing College is a public school (English private boarding and day school) for pupils aged 13–18) in southern England, UK. The school is located in West Sussex, east of Worthing near the village of Lancing, on the south coast of England. Lancing was founded in 1848 by Nathaniel Woodard and educates c. 600 pupils between the ages of 13 and 18; the co-educational ratio is c. 60:40 boys to girls. Girls were admitted beginning in 1971. The first co-ed, Saints’ House, was established in September 2018, bringing the total number of Houses to 10. There are 5 male houses (Gibbs, School, Teme, Heads, Seconds) and 4 female houses (Fields, Sankeys, Manor, Handford).

The college is situated on a hill which is part of the South Downs, and the campus dominates the local landscape.  The college overlooks the River Adur, and the Ladywell Stream, a holy well or sacred stream within the College grounds, has pre-Christian significance.
Woodard's aim was to provide education "based on sound principle and sound knowledge, firmly grounded in the Christian faith," and the discipline of the prefect's cane. However John Dancy was appointed headmaster in 1953 to improve academic standards, which had taken second place to prowess in sport. Lancing was the first of a family of more than 30 schools founded by Woodard. Other schools include Ardingly College, Bloxham School, The Cathedral School, Denstone College, and Ellesmere College.

Roughly 65% of pupils are either full or weekly boarders, at a cost of £37,065 per year; 35% are day pupils, at a cost of £25,320 per year. Occasional overnight stays are available to day pupils at an additional cost of £50 per night.

The school is a member of the Headmasters' and Headmistresses' Conference. Girls were first admitted in 1970. The school is dominated by a Gothic revival chapel, and follows a high church Anglican tradition.  The College of St Mary and St Nicolas (as it was originally known) in Shoreham-by-Sea was intended for the sons of upper middle classes and professional men; in time this became Lancing College, moving to its present site in 1857.

The school's buildings of the 1850s were designed by the architect Richard Cromwell Carpenter, with later ones by John William Simpson.

In 2003, it was one of fifty of the country's leading independent schools which were found guilty of running an illegal price-fixing cartel which had allowed them to drive up fees for thousands of parents. Each school was required to pay a nominal penalty of £10,000 and all agreed to make ex-gratia payments totalling three million pounds into a trust designed to benefit pupils who attended the schools during the period in respect of which fee information was shared.

Chapel 

The foundation stone of the college chapel was laid in 1868, but the chapel itself was not finished in Woodard's lifetime. It stands at about 50 metres (with foundations going down 20 metres into the ground), but the original plans called for a tower at the west end which would raise the height to 100 metres. The apex of the vaulting rises to 27.4 m (90 ft). It was designed by R. H. Carpenter and William Slater, and is built of Sussex sandstone from Scaynes Hill.

The chapel was dedicated to St Mary and St Nicholas in 1911, although the college worshipped in the finished crypt from 1875. St Nicholas is the patron saint of children. Inside can be found, among other things, the tomb of the founder, three organs, and a rose window designed by Stephen Dykes Bower, completed in 1977, and the largest rose window in England, being 32 ft in diameter. People acknowledge it as the largest school chapel in the world, despite the fact that there appears to be no study or survey publicly available that can confirm that.

The eastern organ is a two-manual mechanical organ built by the Danish firm Frobenius and was installed and voiced in situ in 1986. That year also marked the completion of the rebuild of the four-manual Walker organ at the west end of the chapel – both of which were showcased in the opening concert by the American organ virtuoso, Carlo Curley.

A stained-glass window was commissioned in memory of Trevor Huddleston OL, and consecrated by Desmond Tutu on 22 May 2007.

The unfinished west end of the chapel, which had remained bricked up since 1978 (bricks replaced the previous corrugated iron), was completed in the summer of 2021 with the addition of an open three-arched porch designed by Michael Drury.

The chapel was closed to visitors during the coronavirus pandemic and, subsequently, during the completion of the west end porch and refurbishment work on the school kitchens opposite, reopening to the public on 25 April 2022.

Campus 
During World War II, students were evacuated to Downton Castle in Herefordshire.  Both the main college and the prep school buildings were requisitioned by the Admiralty and became part of the Royal Navy shore establishment .

Developments 

In 1856 Lancing created its own code of football which (unlike other school codes) was regarded as a means of fostering teamwork.

Notable alumni

Arts
 George Warner Allen (1916–1988), artist of the Neo-Romantic school.
 Tim Battersby,(1962–1967) composer, musician and lyricist
 David Bedford (1937–2011), composer and musician, worked with (among others) Mike Oldfield,orchestrating Tubular Bells.
 Giles Cooper (1918–1966), radio dramatist, injured in The Spanish Civil War, later working with The Royal Shakespeare Company, Kenneth Williams and Harold Pinter and dramatised the works of John Wyndham, Charles Dickens and Sir Arthur Conan Doyle.
 John Lowry-Corry, 8th Earl Belmore, Patron of the Arts, on the board of the National Gallery of Ireland. 
 Frederick Gore (1913–2009), post-impressionist artist, educator and author.
 Brodrick Haldane (1912–1996), art photographer whom Sir Cecil Beaton described as the founder of modern society photography.
 Henry Hardy, student and editor of the epistemological, dialectical and historiographical works of Isaiah Berlin and music composer
 Sir Peter Pears (1910–1986), tenor,associated with the composer Benjamin Britten, his personal and professional partner
 Peter Ball (1932-2019) Suffragan Bishop of Lewes 1992-1993, convicted sex offender.
 Edward Piper (1938–1990), artist (son of British Modernist painter and Official War artist, John Piper)
 Sir Tim Rice, lyricist,best known for work with Andrew Lloyd Webber, with whom he wrote Joseph and the Amazing Technicolor Dreamcoat, Jesus Christ Superstar, and Evita; with Björn Ulvaeus and Benny Andersson of ABBA, with whom he wrote Chess 
 Neil Richardson (1930–2010), composer, arranger and conductor of various BBC Radio Orchestras

Literature
 Nigel Andrews, film critic and author
 Stuart Cloete (1897–1976), novelist
 Andrew Crofts (author), ghostwriter
 Plantagenet Somerset Fry (1931–1996), historian and author
 Mark Mills (writer), novelist and screenplay writer
 Jan Morris, author and journalist
 Alex Preston, novelist and descendant of the 19th-century British Prime Minister Charles Grey, 2nd Earl Grey.
 Tom Sharpe, novelist.
 Evelyn Waugh (1903–1966), novelist
 Philip Womack, author and journalist, married to Princess Tatiana von Preussen.

Broadcasting, theatre and film
 George Baker (1931–2011), actor best known for portraying Tiberius in I, Claudius, and Inspector Wexford in The Ruth Rendell Mysteries.
 Christopher Hampton, playwright
 Sir David Hare, playwright
 Alex Horne, comedian
 Royce Ryton (1924–2009), actor and playwright
 Jeremy Sinden (1950–1996), actor in Chariots of Fire and Brideshead Revisited.
 Dali Tambo, South African TV presenter 
 Jamie Theakston, TV and radio presenter
 John Williams (1903–1983), actor, appeared in Alfred Hitchcock's Dial M for Murder, The Twilight Zone, Night Gallery, Columbo, and Mission: Impossible.

Politics and law
 Nana Addo Dankwa Akufo-Addo, President of Ghana (2017–)
 Greg Barker, Baron Barker of Battle, Minister of State for Energy and Climate Change (2010–2014)
 Nicholas Browne-Wilkinson, Baron Browne-Wilkinson, Vice-Chancellor of the Supreme Court (1985–1991), Senior Lord of Appeal in Ordinary (1995–2000)
 Tom Driberg, Baron Bradwell (1905–1976), Chairman of the Labour Party (1957–1958)
 Sir Roger Fulford (1902–1983), President of the Liberal Party (1964–1965)
 Patrick Maitland, 17th Earl of Lauderdale (1911–2008), Member of Parliament for Lanark (1951–1959)
 Sir Robert Megarry (1910–2006), Vice-Chancellor of the Chancery Division (1976–1981), Vice-Chancellor of the Supreme Court (1982–1985)
 Hugh Molson, Baron Molson (1903–1991), Minister of Works (1957–1959)
 William Rhys Powell, barrister, Member of Parliament for Corby (1983–1997)
 Sir Charles Arthur Roe (1841–1926), Chief Justice of the Lahore High Court (1895–1898)
 John Sankey, 1st Viscount Sankey (1866–1948), Lord High Chancellor of Great Britain (1929–1935)
 William Thomas Wells (1908–1990), barrister, Member of Parliament for Walsall (1945–1955) and Walsall North (1955–1974)
 Rob Wilson, Minister for Civil Society (Cabinet Office) (2014–2017)

Diplomatic service
Sir Philip Adams (1915–2001), British Chargé d'affaires to Sudan (1954–1956), British Ambassador to Jordan (1966–1970), British Ambassador to Egypt (1973–1975)
 David Lloyd (diplomat), British Ambassador to Slovenia  (1997–2000)
 Sir Christopher Meyer, British Ambassador to Germany (1997), British Ambassador to the United States (1997–2003)
 Andrew Page, British Ambassador to Slovenia (2009–2013)
 Sir Elwin Palmer (1852–1906), diplomat and colonial administrator
Sir John Richmond (diplomat) (1909–1990), British Ambassador to Kuwait (1961–1963), British Ambassador to Sudan (1965–1966)
Humphrey Trevelyan, Baron Trevelyan (1905–1985), British Chargé d'affaires to China (1953–1955), British Ambassador to Egypt (1955–1956), British Ambassador to Iraq (1958–1961), British Ambassador to Russia (1962–1965), last High Commissioner of Aden (1967)
Edward Twining, Baron Twining (1899–1967), Governor and Commander-in-Chief, North Borneo (1946–1949); Governor and Commander-in-Chief, Tanganyika (1949–1958)
 Sir Armigel Wade (1890–1966), Colonial Secretary in Kenya (1934–1939)

Sciences
 Sir Roy Calne,  pioneer of liver transplantation
Jack Herbert Driberg, anthropologist
 Basil William Sholto Mackenzie, 2nd Baron Amulree (1900–1983), physician and geriatrician
 Charles Francis Massey Swynnerton (1877–1938), naturalist
 Richard Mason (explorer) 1935-1961, last British person to have been killed by Uncontacted peoples in the Amazon
 Gino Watkins (1907–1932), Arctic explorer

The Church
 Michael Ball, suffragan Bishop of Jarrow (1980–1990) and Bishop of Truro (1990–1997)
 Peter Ball, suffragan Bishop of Lewes (1977–1992) and Bishop of Gloucester (1992–1993), convicted sex offender
 Christopher Russell Campling, Dean of Ripon (1984–1995)
 Thomas William Cook (1866–1928), Bishop of Lewes (1926–1928)
 Charles John Corfe (1843–1921), inaugural Bishop in Korea (1889–1904)
 Anthony Charles Foottit, Bishop of Lynn (1999–2003)
 Sir Francis Heathcote, 9th Baronet (1868–1961), Anglican Bishop of New Westminster (1940–1951)
 Sir Edwyn Hoskyns, 12th Baronet (1851–1925), Bishop of Burnley (1901–1904), Bishop of Southwell (1904–1925) 
 Trevor Huddleston (1913–1998), Archbishop of the Indian Ocean (1976–1984), Bishop of Masasi (1959–1968), Bishop of Stepney (1968–1978), Bishop of Mauritius (1978–1984)
 John Dudley Galtrey Kirkham, Bishop of Sherborne (1976–2001)
 Lewis Evan Meredith (1900–1968), Bishop of Dover (1957–1964)
 Cyril Jonathan Meyrick, Bishop of Lynn (2011–)
 David Reindorp, vicar of Chelsea Old Church, Chaplain to the Honourable Artillery Company and to the Worshipful Company of Fan Makers
 Erik Routley (1917–1982), Congregational minister, composer and musicologist
 James Leo Schuster (1912–2006), Bishop of St John's (1956–1980)
 Henry Edward Champneys Stapleton, Dean of Carlisle (1988–1998)
 Mark Napier Trollope (1862–1930), third Bishop in Korea (1911–1930)
Ajahn Vajiro ( translated as the thunderbolt of Indra ), Theravada Buddhist Bhikkhu and disciple of Ajahn Chah and Ajahn Sumedho, received Upasampadā ( ordination )  at Wat Pah Pong hermitage in Ubon Ratchathani, North East Thailand, later helping establish Amaravati Buddhist Monastery in Hertfordshire, England. Ajahn Vajiro is founder and Abbot of Sumedharama, a Buddhist Vihara Monastery in the Theravada Forest Tradition of Ajahn Chah in Ericeira, Portugal.

Armed forces
 Lt-Gen Sir Louis Jean Bols (1867–1930), Chief of Staff to the Third Army (World War I), Chief Administrator of Palestine (1919–1920)
Major-General Eric Louis Bols (1904–1985), General Officer Commanding (GOC) 6th Airborne Division (1944–1946)
Brig Sir Iltyd Nicholl Clayton (1886–1965), policy-maker active in formation of the Arab League
 Col. Andrew Croft (1906—1998), explorer and member of the Special Operations Executive 
 Lt-Gen Sir John Fullerton Evetts (1891–1988), Assistant Chief of the Imperial General Staff (1942–1944), Master-General of the Ordnance (1944–1946)
 H.S.H. Maj Prince George G. Imeretinsky (1897–1972), Grenadier Guards and Royal Flying Corps Officer
 H.S.H. Sqn Ldr Prince Michael Imeretinsky (1900–1975), Royal Flying Corps and Royal Air Force Volunteer Reserve Officer
 Col St George Corbet Gore (1849–1913), Surveyor General of India (1899–1904)
 Thomas Percy Henry Touchet-Jesson, 23rd Baron Audley (1913–1963), soldier, playwright
 Capt John Letts (1897–1918), First World War flying ace
 Maj George Henry Wellington Loftus, 7th Marquess of Ely (1903–1969), soldier
 Maj Galbraith Lowry-Corry, 7th Earl Belmore (1913–1960), soldier
 Lt-Gen Vyvyan Pope (1891–1941), GOC XXX Corps (1941)
 AVM John Frederick Powell (1915–2008), Director of Education Services RAF
 Sqn Ldr/Lt Cdr Jeffrey Quill (1913–1996), Spitfire test pilot
 Lt-Gen Sir Alan Reay (1925–2012), Director General Army Medical Services (1981–1984)
 Gen Sir Neil Ritchie (1897–1983), Commander-in Chief, Eighth Army (1941–1942)
 Maj-Gen David Rutherford-Jones, Commandant of the Royal Military Academy, Sandhurst (2007–2009), Military Secretary (2009–2011)
 AVM Sir Stanley Vincent (1897–1976), Air Officer Commanding No. 13 Group (1943–1944), Air Officer Commanding No. 11 Group (1948–1950), only RAF pilot to shoot down the enemy in both world wars
Maj-Gen Sir Alexander Wilson (1858–1937), Lieutenant Governor of Jersey (1916–1920)
RAdm Sir Robert Woodard, Commander of the Royal Yacht Britannia (1985–1990)

Business
 Sir Edgar Beck (1911–2000), Chairman (1961–79) then President (1981–2000) of Mowlem
 Sinclair Beecham, co-founder of Pret a Manger
 Sir John Gilbert Newton Brown (1916–2003), Publisher of the Oxford University Press (1956–1980)
 Sir Michael Darrington, Managing Director of Greggs
 Paul Duffen, Chairman of Hull City A.F.C. (2007–2010)
 Stephen Green, Baron Green of Hurstpierpoint, Group Chairman of HSBC Holdings plc (2006–2010), Minister of State for Trade and Investment (2011–2013)
 Sir Derek Alun-Jones (1933–2004), Chairman of Ferranti (1982–1990)
 Raymond Kwok Ping Luen, vice-chairman and Managing Director of Sun Hung Kai Properties, Chairman of SmarTone Telecommunications Holdings Limited

Sport
 Thomas Southey Baker (1848–1902), amateur athlete who was on the winning crew that won The Boat Race in 1869 and played for England in the fourth unofficial football match against Scotland in November 1871.
 Reginald Birkett (1849–1898), England footballer, 1880 FA Cup winner
 Tony Bloom (1970 - ), Chairman of Brighton and Hove Albion Football Club
 Edward Cawston (1911–1998), Sussex cricketer
 Edgar Field (1854–1934), England footballer, 1880 FA Cup winner
 Andy Frampton, footballer
 Henry Hammond (1866–1910), England footballer
 Elphinstone Jackson (1868–1945), England footballer and co-founder of the Indian Football Association
Dunlop Manners (1916–1994), first-class cricketer
Sholto Marcon (1890–1959), England field hockey player, gold medallist at the 1920 Summer Olympics.
 Richard Meade, England equestrian and gold medallist at the 1968 Summer Olympics and 1972 Summer Olympics
 George Neale (1869–1915), cricketer
 Cyril Richards (1870–1933), cricketer
 Peter Robinson, cricketer
 Graham Sharman, cricketer and squash player
 Charles Wollaston (1849–1926), England footballer, five times FA Cup winner, eighth captain of the England national football team

Academia
 Rajnarayan Chandavarkar (1953–2006), historian and author, reader in the history and politics of South Asia and fellow at Trinity College, Cambridge.
 Nicholas Goodrick-Clarke, Nazi era scholar and researcher of esoteric mystical and secret orders.
 Max Mallowan (1904–1978), archaeologist and scholar; British archaeologist, specialising in ancient Middle Eastern history, Mesopotamian civilization and the heritage of Nineveh. Mallowan was appointed Commander of the Order of the British Empire in the 1960 Queen's Birthday Honours , and knighted in 1968 
 Brian Manning (1927–2004), radical Marxist polemicist and political activist, member of the Irish Socialist Workers Network.
 Rana Mitter, historian and political scientist, focusing on realpolitik, China and the country's increasing role in a multipolar world.
 Henry Nettleship (1839–1893), English classical scholar of Virgil.
 Peter Self (1919–1999), scholar, Professor of Public Administration at the London School of Economics, where he was a prominent member and leader of its Greater London Group research centre. Father of author Will Self.
 John Dover Wilson (1881–1969), literary critic; professor and scholar of Renaissance drama, focusing particularly on the work of William Shakespeare.

Notable former staff members
 Richard Budworth (1867–1937), former Master and an English rugby union forward
 Sir William Gladstone, 7th Baronet (born 1925), former Head Master and Chief Scout of the United Kingdom
 Harry Guest, former Master and poet
 G.O. Smith, sportsman and footballer of the nineteenth century
 John Inge, former chemistry teacher and Assistant Chaplain and current Bishop of Worcester
 Edward Clarke Lowe (1823–1912), former Second Master, Provost of St Nicholas College Lancing and key participant in the foundation and development of the Woodard Schools, and first Headmaster of Hurstpierpoint College
 Arthur Temple Lyttelton, Provost of St Nicholas College Lancing, third Bishop of Southampton (1898–1903)
 Sheppard Frere, former House Master, Professor of the Archaeology of the Roman Provinces at the University of London (1961–1966), Professor of the Archaeology of the Roman Empire at Oxford University
J. F. Roxburgh (1888–1954), former Housemaster, first Headmaster of Stowe School
 Haldane Campbell Stewart (1868—1942), former Director of Music. Musician and composer. Organist and choirmaster at Magdalen College, Oxford (1919–1938, 1941–1942). Cricketer for Kent County Cricket Club (1892–1903).  Father of concert viola performer, Jean Stewart, and of Lorn Alastair Stewart (Johnnie Stewart), who was creator of Top of the Pops.

Headmasters 

 Henry Jacobs (Aug–Dec 1848)
 Charles Edward Moberly (1849–1851)
 John Branthwaite (1851–1859)
 Henry Walford (1859–1861)
 Robert Edward Sanderson (1862–1889)
 Harry Ward McKenzie (1889–1894)
 Ambrose John Wilson (1895–1901)
 Bernard Henry Tower (1901–1909)
 Canon Henry Thomas Bowlby (1909–1925)
 Cuthbert Harold Blakiston (1925–1934)
 Frank Cecil Doherty (1935–1953)
 John Christopher Dancy (1953–1961)
 Sir Erskine William Gladstone KG Bt (1961–1969)
 Ian David Stafford Beer (1969–1981)
 James Stephen Woodhouse (1981–1993)
 Christopher John Saunders (1993–1998)
 Peter M. Tinniswood (1998–2005)
 Richard R. Biggs (acting, 2005–2006)
 Jonathan William James Gillespie FRSA (Sept 2006–2014)
 Dominic Oliver (2014–present)

Coat of Arms

See also
List of works by R. C. Carpenter

References

External links

Lancing College school website
The Woodard Corporation
Old Lancing: OLs
Lancing Prep Hove school website
Lancing Prep Worthing school website
Little Lancing - Lancing College Nursery website
ISI Inspection Reports – Hove Prep School & Worthing Prep School & Senior School

Coordinates: 

Anglo-Catholic educational establishments
Educational institutions established in 1848
Member schools of the Headmasters' and Headmistresses' Conference
Boarding schools in West Sussex
Co-educational boarding schools
Woodard Schools
Private schools in West Sussex
 
1848 establishments in England
Church of England private schools in the Diocese of Chichester
Grade II* listed buildings in West Sussex